The Secret Lives of Dentists is a 2002 drama film directed by Alan Rudolph. The screenplay was written by Craig Lucas, based on the novella The Age of Grief by Jane Smiley. It had its world premiere at the 2002 Toronto International Film Festival and was subsequently screened at several other festivals, including Sundance and Cannes. It had a limited theatrical release in the United States on August 1, 2003.

The film won two awards from the New York Film Critics Circle, including Best Actress for Hope Davis and Best Screenplay for Craig Lucas.

Plot
David and Dana Hurst are dentists who are married with three daughters and share a dental practice in Westchester County, New York. Dana is in the chorus of a community opera production, and when David goes backstage to give her a good luck charm, he sees her in the arms of another man. As he contemplates how to handle this, he begins having imaginary conversations with a difficult former patient. When the whole family gets the flu, everything is brought to a head.

Cast

Critical reception
On review aggregator website Rotten Tomatoes, The Secret Lives of Dentists has an approval rating of 85% based on 94 reviews. The critics' consensus states, "A witty and honest look at marriage in decay." On Metacritic, the film has a score of 76 out of 100 based on 35 reviews, indicating "generally favorable reviews".

In a three-star review, Roger Ebert of the Chicago Sun-Times wrote, "What you will find [here] is a film with an uncanny feeling for the rhythms of daily life, acted by Scott and Davis with attention to those small inflections of speech that can turn words into weapons", adding that "Scott is wonderful here in the way he shows his character caring for the family while coming apart inside."

Mick LaSalle of the San Francisco Chronicle gave a warm review, writing "Lucas' script captures the intimacy of marriage and the ways in which married couple can easily fall into a pattern of irritation and recrimination. The film presents a realistic and artful treatment of a subject not often dealt with in cinema -- and rarely with honesty. Davis and Scott respond with heartfelt, edgy performances."

Awards and nominations

Notes

References

External links

2002 films
Films about dentistry
American comedy-drama films
2000s English-language films
2002 comedy-drama films
Films directed by Alan Rudolph
Films based on short fiction
Adultery in films
Midlife crisis films
2000s American films
2002 independent films
American independent films
Films set in New York (state)